Debasis Chattopadhyay (born 20 October 1967) is an Indian plant molecular biologist, geneticist and a scientist at the National Institute of Plant Genome Research (NIPGR). Known for his studies in the fields of plant stress biology and genomics, Chattopadhyay is an elected fellow of all the three major Indian science Academies namely the Indian Academy of Sciences, the Indian National Science Academy and the National Academy of Sciences, India. He is also an elected fellow of the West Bengal Academy of Science and Technology.

Chattopadhyay did his doctoral studies at the University of Calcutta and after securing a PhD, moved to the US for his doctoral studies at the Cleveland Clinic. Subsequently, he joined the National Institute of Plant Genome Research, New Delhi where he holds the position of a Grade VII scientist. His research focus is on abiotic stress tolerance and genome sequencing of plants and he holds a US patent for Chimeric construct of mungbean yellow mosaic india virus (MYMIV) and its uses, a process he has co-developed with two of his colleagues at NIPGR. His studies have been documented by way of a number of articles and ResearchGate, an online repository of scientific articles has listed 83 of them. Besides, he has contributed chapters to books edited by others. He was chosen for the  Prof. Umakant Sinha Memorial Award of the Indian Science Congress Association in 2006. The Department of Biotechnology of the Government of India awarded him the National Bioscience Award for Career Development, one of the highest Indian science awards, for his contributions to biosciences, in 2010. He received the NASI-Reliance Industries Platinum Jubilee Award in 2017. He is a recipient of Tata Innovation Fellowship in 2015. He has been awarded with J.C. Bose Fellowship by the Science and Engineering Research Board, Department of Science and Technology, Government of India in 2020.

Selected bibliography

Chapters

Articles

See also 

 Transgene
 microRNA

Notes

References

External links 
 

N-BIOS Prize recipients
Indian scientific authors
Living people
Indian medical researchers
1967 births
Scientists from Delhi
Indian molecular biologists
Indian geneticists
University of Calcutta alumni
Cleveland Clinic people
Fellows of the Indian Academy of Sciences
Fellows of The National Academy of Sciences, India
Fellows of the Indian National Science Academy
Indian patent holders
21st-century Indian inventors
Scientists from West Bengal